Central High School is a high school in Bridgeport, Fairfield County, Connecticut in the United States. It was founded in 1876 as Bridgeport High School. 

In 2003 the school held 2,217 students and 152 teachers. Ethnically the students were 41% African-American, 41% Hispanic, 13% white and 4% Asian, with .1% marked as unknown.

The current school building was constructed in 1963–4, and was dedicated on October 25, 1964.
The school is under renovation scheduled to be complete in 2021.

Notable alumni

Al Capp, cartoonist (failed to graduate)
Keith Carlos, winner, cycle 21 of America's Next Top Model
Kiddo Davis,  MLB outfielder.
Michael Jai White, actor
Fred De Luca, Subway restaurant's co-founder
John Mayer's father, Richard, was principal of Central High School
Greg McCarthy, former MLB player (Seattle Mariners)
Kevin Nealon, comedian, Saturday Night Live
John Schick, former professional basketball player (Toledo Jeeps)
Vinnie Vincent, guitarist, KISS, Vinnie Vincent Invasion
Deborah Walley, actress
Trevardo Williams, professional NFL player (Houston Texans)

See also
 John F. Kennedy Stadium (Bridgeport)

References

External links

 

Educational institutions established in 1876
Education in Bridgeport, Connecticut
Schools in Fairfield County, Connecticut
Public high schools in Connecticut
1876 establishments in Connecticut